The 1976 Gael Linn Cup, the most important representative competition for elite level participants in the women's team field sport of camogie, was played at junior level only in the three years 1975-7. It was won by Leinster, who defeated Munster in the final, played at Adare.

Arrangements
Munster defeated Connacht by 3–1 to 1–3 at Roscommon, while a late rally by Leinster earned a 4–5 to 1–3victory over Ulster at Mayobridge. Kay Barry snatched a late winning goal for Leinster in the final against Munster at Adare, 2–6 to 2–3.

Final stages

|}

References

External links
 Camogie Association

1976 in camogie
1976